Þorbergsson is an Icelandic surname. Notable people with the name include:

 Auðunn rauði Þorbergsson (1250–1322), Icelandic bishop
 Freysteinn Þorbergsson (1931–1974), Icelandic chess player

Icelandic-language surnames